Língua Geral (General Language) is the name of two distinct lingua francas, spoken in Brazil: the Língua Geral Paulista (Tupi Austral, or Southern Tupi), which was spoken in the region of Paulistania but is now dead, and the Língua Geral Amazônica (Tupinambá) of the Amazon whose modern descendant is Nheengatu.

Both were simplified versions of the Tupi language, the native language of the Tupi people. Portuguese colonizers arrived in Brazil in the 16th century, and faced with an indigenous population that spoke many languages, they sought a means to establish effective communication among the many groups. The two languages were used in the Jesuit Reductions, the Jesuit missions in Brazil and by early colonists; and came to be used by black slaves and other Indian groups.

References
Campbell, Lyle (1997). American Indian Languages: The historical linguistics of Native America. New York: Oxford University Press. 
Rohter, Larry.  "Language Born of Colonialism Thrives Again in Amazon." New York Times. August 28, 2005.

External links
Report on Nheengatú in the Catalogue of South American Languages
Rodrigues, Aryon. 1996. As línguas gerais sul-americanas. Papia, 4(2), p. 6-18.
Etnolinguistica.Org, a discussion list on native South American languages

Colonial Brazil
Tupi–Guarani languages
Portuguese colonization of the Americas
South America Native-based pidgins and creoles
Extinct languages of South America
Languages attested from the 16th century
International auxiliary languages